Beg Beg-e Ban Khoshg (also Romanized as Beg Beg-e Bān Khoshg; also known as Bag Bag Bān Khoshk and Bān Khoshk-e Beg Beg) is a village in Arkavazi Rural District, Chavar District, Ilam County, Ilam Province, Iran. At the 2006 census, its population was 147, in 28 families. The village is populated by Kurds.

References 

Populated places in Ilam County
Kurdish settlements in Ilam Province